This is a list of the world's highest civilian airports, situated at a minimum elevation of  above mean sea level.

See also
 List of lowest airports

Notes

References

Highest
Highest airports